LionsXII ("Lions Twelve"), also known as Singapore LIONSXII, was a Singaporean football club founded in 2011 that played in the Malaysian Liga Super, the top tier of Malaysian football, from their inaugural season until their dissolution following the 2015 season. Their home ground was the 8,000-seater Jalan Besar Stadium, where they have played all their home matches since their establishment.

Managed by the Football Association of Singapore, the squad marked the return of Singapore to the Malaysian football scene since Singapore FA (nicknamed "Lions") dissolved following the Malaysia Cup in 1994. The name is a combination of Lions and XII, which is a special tribute to the fans, who are generally recognised as football's "12th Man". Its motto was "For Country, For Fans. For Passion.”

LionsXII's home kit was in royal red, using the colours of the national flag. Their away kit was in blue, designed to evoke memories of the jersey used in the 1980s and earlier. The club emblem, designed to resemble a lion's paw, showed a fierce and aggressive-looking lion between the white feathery lines.

LionsXII's first silverware was the 2013 Liga Super trophy, in only their second season in the competition; they had finished second in 2012. Their second silverware was the 2015 Malaysia FA Cup when they beat Kelantan 3–1 in the final after a stunning display at the Bukit Jalil Stadium.

History
In 2011, the Football Association of Singapore and the Football Association of Malaysia reached an agreement that would see greater co-operation between the two nations. One of the intended avenues would see the Under-23s play in the Liga Super and Piala Malaysia from 2012 onwards, the first time a Singaporean team would be participating in a Malaysian domestic football league since 1994, when Singapore won the M-League and Piala Malaysia double. Although the new Singapore team would have the existing Under-23s forming its core, senior players were also called upon to guide the younger players. No foreign players were allowed to be part of the Singapore team as this project served as being developmental.

2012 season

LionsXII debuted in the 2012 Liga Super on 10 January 2012 with a 1–2 home defeat to defending champions Kelantan FA. The LionsXII's first win was a 2–1 victory over Kuala Lumpur FA on 17 January. The LionsXII's first away win was a 1–0 victory over Sabah FA on 21 January. LionsXII began their 2012 Piala FA quest on 18 February, with a 3–0 win over UiTM FC. The LionsXII made their way to the quarter-final with a 2–0 win over Betaria FC on 10 March 2012. However, they were beaten by Terengganu FA in the quarter-finals. On 16 June 2012, they defeated Sabah FA 9–0 at home, the biggest win in the MSL season. LionsXII finished second in the league behind Kelantan FA, and bowed out of the semi-final of the 2012 Piala Malaysia after losing in a penalty shoot-out against ATM FA. On 29 December 2012, assistant coach Kadir Yahaya left his position at LionsXII. Soon, Gombak United FC chief Tatsuma Yoshida took over his post.

2013 season

LionsXII were set a target of finishing top five for the 2013 Liga Super. Five overage players were included in this year's squad to guide the younger players, namely Shahril Ishak, Isa Halim, Fazrul Nawaz, Irwan Shah and Baihakki Khaizan. Other key players such as Shahdan Sulaiman and Shaiful Esah no longer featured. The main aim was to develop the U–23 players and prepare them for the upcoming 2013 Southeast Asian Games that would be held at the end of the year.

LionsXII began their campaign by defeating ATM FA 1–0 away. Subsequently, they vanquished the nation's traditional rivals Selangor FA. However, LionsXII stumbled to three losses against lowly T-Team FC and PKNS FC away. One sent them crashing out of the 2013 Piala FA. In a turn of events, LionsXII went on a long unbeaten streak, securing important wins over Pahang FA (3–0), Kelantan FA (1–0), and ATM FA (3–1) at home.

On 2 July 2013, a 4–0 win over relegation-threatened FELDA United FC in the penultimate league game made LionsXII league champions. Singapore's Prime Minister, Lee Hsien Loong was present for the match played in front of a sold-out crowd at the Jalan Besar Stadium. The MSL trophy was also brought to the stadium as the LionsXII received it on home soil after the final whistle. LionsXII became the first foreign team to win the MSL, adding to the four Malaysian league titles it had won in 1979, 1981, 1985, and 1994. The title run was defined by a combination of good defence (13 goals conceded, the best record in the MSL) and goals from set-pieces (17 out of 32). The club chalked up their best home record (10 wins and 1 draw) in the league, making Jalan Besar Stadium a fortress.

On 27 July, LionsXII were drawn into Group D for the 2013 Piala Malaysia with Perak FA, Sarawak FA and Kedah FA. They drew Kedah (2–2) in Singapore and succumbed to two collapses against Perak (1–0) and Sarawak (2–1). With such results, they nearly bowed out of the tournament. At that time, coach V. Sundramoorthy was said to leave LionsXII at the end of the season to take charge of Malaysian Premier League side Negeri Sembilan FA.

On 28 September, LionsXII narrowed a 1–0 victory over ATM FA in the first leg of the quarter-finals of the 2013 Piala Malaysia but squandered to a 1–4 mauling to the Gladiators in the return tie on 4 October. The news of V. Sundramoorthy leaving to helm Negeri Sembilan FA was also then confirmed. Two weeks later, the FAS made public the search for his successor.

2014 season

Sufian Anuar and Khairul Amri were recalled to join LionsXII following the exit of Baihakki Khaizan, Hariss Harun, and Shahril Ishak to Malaysian clubs.

On 7 December 2013, former Johor Darul Takzim coach and ex-Singapore international Fandi Ahmad was offered a three-year contract at the helm of the LionsXII, despite initial denials by the FAS. Fandi took the role ahead of former Warriors FC coach Richard Bok and Liverpool F.C. stalwart Steve McMahon.

The LionsXII opened their league season with a 1–0 defeat against Pahang FA in the Charity Cup Match Curtain Raiser on 17 January 2014.

2015 season
LionsXII clinched their first ever Piala FA after defeating Kelantan FA 3–1 in the final at Bukit Jalil Stadium. Faris Ramli scored the opening goal after just seven minutes before Kelantan equalized just past the hour mark. However, Sahil Suhaimi scored twice in the final 10 minutes of the game to bring the Piala FA to Singapore.

On 25 November 2015, FAM reportedly decided not to extend their Memorandum of Understanding (MoU) with the Football Association of Singapore (FAS), which was signed in 2011. This automatically disqualifies LionsXII from further entering any football tournament in Malaysia. Similarly, Malaysia's squad Harimau Muda also would not be entering Singapore League from then onwards.

It was announced by the Football Association of Singapore that LionsXII were to be disbanded at the end of the season and the players would have to find a new club in 2016. However, their salaries would be maintained with the assistance of FAS if they decide to join an S.League club.

Crest and colours
The club crest signified the paw of a lion in appearance, with very much relevance to the nickname Football Association of Singapore has adopted as Singapore is known to be a Lion City. Looking closer at the crest, there is a lion being embedded in it. Using the lines as contrast, the lion shows ferocity and aggressiveness, resembling the fighting spirit and determination of all the players in the squad. It also illustrates the hunger to win games. All the meanings from the crest have also been included in the official LionsXII theme song, called The Roar Anthem. The XI in the word LionsXII is in black to represent the eleven players on the pitch. I is in red to show that the 12th Man to do make a difference in the team's success. Energetic, ready and passion are the crest's main ideas to be conveyed.

Kit evolution
The kit launched in 2011 had the primary colours of white, red and blue. Playing at home, the players were stripped in the white/red/red kit while in blue/blue/blue kit when playing away in Malaysia. Many T-shirt designs were based on white and red, which are the colours of the Lion City. Also, white symbolised purity and humbleness of the LionsXII. However, during the semi-final Piala Malaysia game between ATM FA and LionsXII in Stadium Majlis Perbandaran Selayang in which they were defeated on penalties and bowed out of the tournament, they wore a combination of the white top and blue bottom. Many fans were feeling displeasure as it looked hideous.

A revamp for the jerseys were called for as many players were dropped in 2013 while young players from S.League club Courts Young Lions were brought in.

Stadium

Since the team was formed, the LionsXII have been playing all their home matches at Jalan Besar Stadium. The stadium was known as the Lions' Den and an "impregnable fortress" where the LionsXII were undefeated in the entire 2013 season.

Support

LionsXII regularly attract over an average of 6,200 fans to Jalan Besar Stadium. The stadium is always minimally half-filled across all matches in all the seasons LionsXII have participated in.

Rivalries
LionsXII held a strong rivalry with Malaysian club Angkatan Tentara Malaysia FA (the Armed Forces team), with the two clubs meeting recently in a cup game in the 2013 Piala Malaysia. In 2012, ATM ended the dream of the club of going into the final of the 2012 Piala Malaysia in a dramatic game. In 2013, LionsXII took revenge by defeating them 1–0 in the 2013 Liga Super opener. However, ATM once again shattered the double wish as they overturned the deficit sustained in the first leg of the 2013 Piala Malaysia quarter-finals and emerged triumphant 4–2 over the LionsXII.

Along the way, long standing issues with Liga Super participants PKNS FC of Selangor and T-Team FC of Terengganu also arose. Despite either team being far from title contenders, LionsXII are still unable to break the voodoo of winning these two teams in away fixtures. In 2012, PKNS and PBDKT T-Team both edged LionsXII with a solitary goal, 1–0 and 2–1 respectively. In spite of beating them 5–0 and 2–1 accordingly at home, they continued the spell in 2013. LionsXII were booted out of the 2013 Piala FA in the first round's encounter with PKNS FC. LionsXII also suffered losses against PKNS (1–0) and T-Team (1–0) at other times, the latter questioned controversy.

Their predecessor as Singaporean Liga Super club, Singapore FA, had a very intense rivalry with Selangor FA.

Partners and sponsors

At the start of 2012, Kingsmen was announced to be the official marketing and sponsorship representative of the LionsXII.

Yolk also began its website partnership with LionsXII as they realised that the voices of the nation were also in need of modernisation to unite the nation behind the LionsXII in their Liga Super run.

Along the way, LionsXII's success has attracted many sponsors. Their Facebook page has hit the total number of 80,000 likes so far. Other partners on social media include Temasek Polytechnic, The Cage, X-League (Singapore) and Tiger Beer Football.

Kit manufacturer and shirt sponsor

On 5 January 2012, Football Association of Singapore announced the appointment of StarHub as the Official Broadcaster and Principal Sponsor of LionsXII. As part of the partnership, StarHub will carry all LionsXII content on its pay TV, online and mobile platforms. Two days after the announcement of the kit, LionsXII sealed a second major sponsorship deal, with news that SilkPro will fund the Singapore outfit to the tune of S$1m during its debut season in Liga Super. On 23 February 2012, LionsXII secured another sponsorship deal, with Shop N Save, a Singapore supermarket, coming on board as the 'Official Supermarket' for the Singapore outfit in its debut season in the Liga Super.

Captains

Management

Last coaching staff

Head coaches
V. Sundramoorthy and Fandi Ahmad were both part of the Singapore Lions 'Dream Team' that won promotion back to the M-league Division 1 and finished as runners-up to Kedah in the Piala Malaysia Final in 1993.

The following year, led by Fandi, Singapore overcame the absence of Sundram to win the 1994 M-League and Piala Malaysia double.

 Information correct as of 9 July 2015. Only League results.

Competition records

Last updated on 23 May 2015.

Club records
Wins
 Record victory: 9–0 (v Sabah, Liga Super, 16 June 2012)

Defeats
 Record defeat: 4–0 (v Selangor, Liga Super, 18 April 2015)

Goals
 Most League goals scored in a season: 53 in 26 matches, Liga Super, 2012
 Fewest League goals scored in a season: 26 in 22 matches, Liga Super, 2014
 Most League goals conceded in a season: 27 in 22 matches, Liga Super, 2014
 Fewest League goals conceded in a season: 18 in 26 matches, Liga Super, 2012

Player records
Goalscorers
 Most goals in a season: 14, Shahril Ishak, (2012)
 Most League goals in a season: 10, Shahril Ishak, (2012)
 Most goals in a single match: 3, Hariss Harun (v Sabah, Liga Super, 16 June 2012), Sufian Anuar (v Pahang, Liga Super, 15 April 2014)

Honours

League
 Liga Super
 Winners: 2013

Cup
 Piala FA
 Winners: 2015

See also
 Singapore FA

References

 
Expatriated football clubs
Football clubs in Singapore
Football clubs in Malaysia
Defunct football clubs in Malaysia